Antimelatoma is a genus of predatory sea snails, marine gastropod molluscs in the family Pseudomelatomidae, the turrids.

Species
Species within the genus Antimelatoma include:
 Antimelatoma buchanani (Hutton, 1873)
 † Antimelatoma waimea Beu, 2011
Species brought into synonymy
 Antimelatoma agasma Cotton, 1947: synonym of Splendrillia woodsi (Beddome, 1883)
 Antimelatoma ahipara Powell A. W. B, 1942: synonym of Antimelatoma buchanani (Hutton, 1873)
 Antimelatoma benthicola Powell A. W. B, 1942: synonym of Antimelatoma buchanani (Hutton, 1873)
 Antimelatoma canyonensis Dell, 1956: synonym of Leucosyrinx canyonensis (Dell, 1956)

References

 Powell A. W. B., New Zealand Mollusca, William Collins Publishers Ltd, Auckland, New Zealand 1979

External links
 
 Bouchet, P.; Kantor, Y. I.; Sysoev, A.; Puillandre, N. (2011). A new operational classification of the Conoidea (Gastropoda). Journal of Molluscan Studies. 77(3): 273-308

 
Pseudomelatomidae
Gastropods of New Zealand
Gastropod genera